Adela punctiferella is a moth of the  family Adelidae or fairy longhorn moths. It was described by Walsingham in 1870. It is found in the semi-arid parts of California and southern Nevada.

References

Adelidae
Moths described in 1870
Moths of North America